Marriage with Limited Liability is a 1931 Austrian-German comedy film directed by Franz Wenzler and starring Charlotte Susa, Georg Alexander and Paul Morgan.  It was shot at the EFA Studios in Berlin. The film's art direction was by Otto Erdmann and Hans Sohnle. It was released by the German subsidiary of Universal Pictures.

Cast
 Charlotte Susa as Irene Kaiser
 Georg Alexander as Dr. Wender, Lawyer
 Paul Morgan as Sr. Springer, Lawyer
 Hans Moser as Georg Kaiser II., Bürovorsteher
 Rosa Valetti
 Werner Fuetterer as Georg Kaiser I.
 Trude Brionne as Hühnerbein
 Tamara Desni
 Anita Mey
 Walter Steinbeck as Judge
 Edwin Jürgensen as Kabarettdirektor
 Gerhard Dammann as Gerichtsdiener

References

Bibliography 
 Klaus, Ulrich J. Deutsche Tonfilme: Jahrgang 1932. Klaus-Archiv, 1988.

External links 
 

1931 films
1931 comedy films
Austrian comedy films
Films of the Weimar Republic
German comedy films
1930s German-language films
Films directed by Franz Wenzler
Films scored by Bronisław Kaper
Universal Pictures films
Austrian black-and-white films
German black-and-white films
1930s German films
Films shot at Halensee Studios